Alphonse Hustache (14 April 1872 – 2 March 1949) was a French entomologist.

He was one of the best specialists on Curculionidae.

Works
He began to write many articles in many journals such as l'Échange, Bulletin de la Société entomologique de France, Miscellanea Entomologica, and many others including north African and South American ones.

Books
 1932 - Curculionidae Gallo-Rhénans, 1189 pages, published in 8 parts in the Annales de la société entomologique de France from 1923 to 1932
 1924 - Synopsis des Curculionides de Madagascar, 524 pages
 1925 - Tableaux analytiques des Coléoptères de la Faune Franco-Rhénane. Curculionidae Ceuthorrhynchini - 314 pages, as a supplement of Miscellanea Entomologica from 1920 to 1925.
 1931 - Tableaux analytiques des Coléoptères de la Faune Franco-Rhénane. Curculionidae Apioninae, 286 pages, as a supplement of Miscellanea Entomologica.
 1934, 1936 & 1938 - He wrote parts 136, 151 and 163 of the Coleopterorum Catalogus, the Sigmund Schenkling's work of his life.

References 

1872 births
1949 deaths
French entomologists
Coleopterists